Samuel Ballard may refer to:

S. Thruston Ballard (1855–1926), American politician in Kentucky
Samuel James Ballard (1765–1829), Royal Navy admiral

See also
 Ballard (surname)